Meir Teper is an American film producer and businessman. He is also one of Nobu's 3 founders, along with Robert De Niro and Nobu Matsuhisa.

Filmography
He was a producer in all films unless otherwise noted.

Film

As an actor

Television

Thanks

References 

American film producers
Year of birth missing (living people)
Living people